The 1984 WTA Swiss Open  was a women's tennis tournament played on outdoor clay courts in Lugano, Switzerland that was part of the 1984 Virginia Slims World Championship Series. The tournament was held from 7 May through 13 May 1984. Third-seeded Manuela Maleeva won the singles title.

Finals

Singles
 Manuela Maleeva defeated  Iva Budařová 6–1, 6–1
 It was Maleeva's 1st career title.

Doubles
 Christiane Jolissaint /  Marcella Mesker defeated  Iva Budařova /  Marcela Skuherská 6–1, 6–2
 It was Jolissaint's 2nd title of the year and the 3rd of her career. It was Mesker's 3rd title of the year and the 5th of her career.

References

External links
 ITF tournament edition details

Swiss Open
WTA Swiss Open
WTA Swiss Open
WTA Swiss Open
1984 in Swiss women's sport